Charles Abbott "Ab" Conway (7 October 1914 – 10 March 2001) was a Canadian middle-distance runner. He competed in the men's 800 metres at the 1936 Summer Olympics.

References

External links 
 
 
 

1914 births
2001 deaths
Athletes (track and field) at the 1936 Summer Olympics
Canadian male middle-distance runners
Olympic track and field athletes of Canada
Sportspeople from Moose Jaw